Nathaniel Sprenkel (born April 18, 1990) is an American soccer player.

Career

College

Sprenkel played his first year in 2008 at Duquesne University in Pittsburgh, but returned to Indiana to play at DePauw University from 2009–2011. While with the DePauw Tigers, Sprenkel helped the squad capture the North Coast Athletic Conference tournament title. He was also named a NSCAA Second-Team All-American, and the NCAC's Defensive Player of the Year. He graduated from DePauw in 2012 with a major in Psychology and minor in Education.

USL PRO

Sprenkel signed with USL PRO side Antigua Barracuda FC and made his professional debut in a 1–0 loss against the Orange County Blues. Later in 2012 he signed a two-year contract with Chicago Soul between 2012–13 before returning to in Greenscastle, Indiana to become an assistant coach for DePauw's soccer team.

Indy Eleven

The Zionsville native signed with his home team, the Indy Eleven, on November 11, 2013.

Career statistics

Club

References

1990 births
Living people
American soccer players
American expatriate soccer players
Duquesne Dukes men's soccer players
Antigua Barracuda F.C. players
Indy Eleven players
Association football goalkeepers
Soccer players from Indiana
Expatriate footballers in Antigua and Barbuda
USL Championship players